Louise Natoli (born 24 April 1979 in Melbourne) is an Australian slalom canoeist who competed from the mid-1990s to the late 2000s. She finished seventh in the K-1 event at the 2004 Summer Olympics in Athens

References
Sports-Reference.com profile

1979 births
Australian female canoeists
Canoeists at the 2004 Summer Olympics
Living people
Olympic canoeists of Australia